Davidson County is a county in the U.S. state of Tennessee. It is located in the heart of Middle Tennessee. As of the 2020 census, the population was 715,884, making it the second most populous county in Tennessee. Its county seat is Nashville, the state capital and largest city.

Since 1963, the city of Nashville and Davidson County have had a consolidated government called the "Metropolitan Government of Nashville and Davidson County", commonly referred to as "Metro Nashville" or "Metro".

Davidson County has the largest population in the 13-county Nashville-Davidson–Murfreesboro–Franklin Metropolitan Statistical Area, the state's most populous metropolitan area. Nashville has always been one of the region's centers of commerce, industry, transportation, and culture, but it did not become the capital of Tennessee until 1827 and did not gain permanent capital status until 1843.

History 
Davidson County is the oldest county in the 41-county region of Middle Tennessee. It dates to 1783, shortly after the end of the American Revolution, when the North Carolina legislature created the county and named it in honor of William Lee Davidson, a North Carolina general who was killed opposing the crossing of the Catawba River by General Cornwallis's British forces on February 1, 1781. The county seat, Nashville, is the oldest permanent European settlement in Middle Tennessee, founded by James Robertson and John Donelson during the winter of 1779–80 and the waning days of the Revolutionary War.

The first white settlers established the Cumberland Compact to establish a basic rule of law and to protect their land titles. Through much of the early 1780s, the settlers also faced a hostile response from the Native American tribes, such as the Cherokee, Muscogee (Creek), and Shawnee who while not living in the area used is as a hunting ground and resented the newcomers moving into there and competing for its  resources. As the county's many known archaeological sites attest, Native American cultures had occupied areas of Davidson County for thousands of years. The first white Americans to enter the area were fur traders. Long hunters came next, having heard about a large salt lick, known as French Lick, where they hunted game and traded with the Native Americans.

In 1765, Timothy Demonbreun, a hunter, trapper, and former Governor of Illinois under the French, and his wife lived in a small cave (now known as Demonbreun's Cave) on the south side of the Cumberland River near present-day downtown Nashville. They were the parents of the first white child to be born in Middle Tennessee. A number of the settlers came from Kentucky and the Upper South. Since the land was fertile, they cultivated hemp and tobacco, using the labor of enslaved African Americans, and also raised blooded livestock of high quality, including horses. Generally holding less land than the plantations of Western Tennessee, many Middle Tennessee planters nevertheless became wealthy during this period.

Davidson County was much larger when it was created in 1783. However, four more counties were carved out of Davidson County's territory between 1786 and 1856.
 Sumner County created in 1786
 Williamson County, created in 1799
 Rutherford County, created in 1803 (also included parts of Wilson County)
 Cheatham County, created in 1856 (also included parts of Dickson, Montgomery and Robertson counties)

Following the outbreak of the American Civil War in 1861, the voters of Davidson County voted narrowly in favor of seceding from the United States: 5,635 in favor, 5,572 against. However, the Union Army occupied the county in February 1862, which caused widespread social disruption as the state's governing institutions broke down.

Notable people 
See List of people from Nashville, Tennessee for notable people that were residents of both Nashville and Davidson County.
Kizziah J. Bills, Black American suffragist, a correspondent and columnist for Black press in Chicago, and a civil rights activist. She was raised in Davidson County.
Newman Haynes Clanton, Democrat, western cattle rustler and outlaw
Jermain Wesley Loguen, abolitionist leader
Benjamin "Pap" Singleton, abolitionist leader

Geography 

The Cumberland River flows from east to west through the middle of the county. Two dams within the county are Old Hickory Lock and Dam and J. Percy Priest Dam, operated by the United States Army Corps of Engineers. Important tributaries of the Cumberland in Davidson County include Whites Creek, Manskers Creek, Stones River, Mill Creek, and the Harpeth River.

Adjacent counties 
Robertson County, Tennessee – north
Sumner County, Tennessee – northeast
Wilson County, Tennessee – east
Rutherford County, Tennessee – southeast
Williamson County, Tennessee – south
Cheatham County, Tennessee – west

National protected area 
Natchez Trace Parkway (part)

State protected areas 
Bicentennial Mall State Park
Couchville Cedar Glade State Natural Area (part)
 Harpeth River State Park (part)
Hill Forest State Natural Area
Long Hunter State Park (part)
Mount View Glade State Natural Area
Percy Priest Wildlife Management Area (part)
Radnor Lake State Natural Area

Major highways

Demographics

2020 census

As of the 2020 United States census, there were 715,884 people, 289,427 households, and 152,833 families residing in the county.

2000 census
As of the census of 2000, there were 569,891 people, 237,405 households, and 138,169 families residing in the county. The population density was 1,135 people per square mile (438/km2). There were 252,977 housing units at an average density of 504 per square mile (194/km2). The racial makeup of the county was 67.0% White, 26.0% Black or African American, 0.3% Native American, 2.3% Asian, 0.1% Pacific Islander, 2.4% from other races, and 2.0% from two or more races. 4.6% of the population were Hispanic or Latino of any race.

In 2005 the racial makeup of the county was 61.7% non-Hispanic white, 27.5% African-American, 6.6% Latino and 2.8% Asian.

In 2000 there were 237,405 households, out of which 26.7% had children under the age of 18 living with them, 39.9% were married couples living together, 14.3% had a female householder with no husband present, and 41.8% were non-families. 33.4% of all households were made up of individuals, and 8.2% had someone living alone who was 65 years of age or older. The average household size was 2.30 and the average family size was 2.96.

In the county, the population was spread out, with 22.2% under the age of 18, 11.6% from 18 to 24, 34.0% from 25 to 44, 21.1% from 45 to 64, and 11.1% who were 65 years of age or older. The median age was 34 years. For every 100 females, there were 93.80 males. For every 100 females age 18 and over, there were 90.80 males.

The median income for a household in the county was $39,797, and the median income for a family was $49,317. Males had a median income of $33,844 versus $27,770 for females. The per capita income for the county was $23,069. About 10.0% of families and 13.0% of the population were below the poverty line, including 19.1% of those under age 18 and 10.5% of those age 65 or over.

Politics 
Davidson County is a Democratic stronghold, due to it comprising the liberal bastion of Nashville. It last went Republican when George H. W. Bush won the county in 1988, and Democratic presidential candidates have handily won the county by double-digit margins since. However, Davidson County has trended even more Democratic in recent years while most of the rest of the state has shifted Republican. In 2020, Joe Biden won Davidson county with 64.5% of the vote and a 32.1% margin of victory, the best Democratic performance in the county since Franklin D. Roosevelt's landslide victories.

In local elections, the county is equally Democratic. Since the end of the Civil War, Nashville has mostly been in the 5th district, however, between 1875 and 1933, and 1943 and 1953, it was located in the 6th district. No Republican has represented Nashville in the Congress since Horace Harrison left office in 1875.

Federal officers 
U.S. Senators:  Marsha Blackburn (R) and Bill Hagerty (R)
U.S. Representatives: Jim Cooper (D – District 5)

State officers 
State Senators: Brenda Gilmore (D), Heidi Campbell (D), Jeff Yarbro (D), and Ferrell Haile (R)
State Representatives: Bo Mitchell (D), Bill Beck (D), Mike Stewart (D), Jason Powell (D), Vincent Dixie (D), John Ray Clemmons (D), Bob Freeman (D), Harold Love (D), Jason Potts (D), Darren Jernigan (D)

Local officers 
Mayor: John Cooper
Vice Mayor and Metropolitan Council President: Jim Shulman
City Council: see Metropolitan Council of Nashville and Davidson County

Communities 
All of Davidson County is encompassed under the consolidated Metropolitan Government of Nashville and Davidson County. However, several municipalities that were incorporated before consolidation retain some autonomy as independent municipalities. These are:

Belle Meade
Berry Hill
Forest Hills
Goodlettsville (partly in Sumner County)
Oak Hill
Ridgetop (primarily in Robertson County)

For U.S. Census purposes, the portions of Davidson County that lie outside the boundaries of the six independently incorporated municipalities are collectively treated as the Nashville-Davidson balance.

Unincorporated communities 
In addition, several other communities in the county that lack the official status of incorporated municipalities (either because they were never incorporated or because they relinquished their municipal charters when consolidation occurred) maintain their independent identities to varying degrees. These include:

Antioch
Bellevue
Donelson
Green Hills
Hermitage
Inglewood
Joelton (partly in Cheatham County)
Lakewood
Madison (includes historical Haysboro)
Old Hickory
Pasquo
West Meade
Whites Creek
Una

Education
Metropolitan Nashville Public School District is the school district of the entire county.

Tennessee School for the Blind is a state-operated school in Nashville.

See also 
National Register of Historic Places listings in Davidson County, Tennessee
Piomingo
Buchanan's Station
Chickasaw

References

Further reading

External links 

Metropolitan Nashville and Davidson County official site

 
Nashville metropolitan area
1783 establishments in North Carolina
Populated places established in 1783
Nashville-Davidson–Murfreesboro–Franklin, TN Metropolitan Statistical Area
Middle Tennessee